Feel That Fire is the fourth studio album by American country music singer Dierks Bentley. It was released on February 3, 2009 via Capitol Records Nashville. The album produced three singles with the title track, "Sideways", and "I Wanna Make You Close Your Eyes". The first two reached number one on the U.S. Billboard Hot Country Songs chart, while the third peaked at number 2. The album reached number one the U.S. Billboard Top Country Albums chart. It was also certified gold by the Recording Industry Association of America and has even sold over 327,000 copies as of 2010.

Content
As with all of his previous albums, Bentley co-produced this one with Brett Beavers. Bentley co-wrote most of this album's songs along with both Brett and Jim Beavers, the latter of whom is Brett's brother. "I Can't Forget Her" is one of the album's only two songs that Bentley did not co-write. That song was previously recorded by Clay Walker on his 2003 album A Few Questions.

The title track, which Bentley and Brett Beavers co-wrote with The Warren Brothers (Brad and Brett Warren), was the album's first single. That song became Bentley's sixth number one hit on the U.S. Billboard Hot Country Songs chart in early 2009. The album's second single "Sideways", which Bentley co-wrote with Jim Beavers, became the singer's seventh number one hit in July 2009.

The album has received many positive reviews and put in many "Best Country Albums of 2009". The Chicago Tribune ranked it No. 1 on their list of the best country albums of the year.

The song "Beautiful World" was nominated for Best Country Collaboration w/ Vocals at the 52nd Grammy Awards.

Track listing

Personnel

 Alan Bartram – upright bass (12)
 Brett Beavers – banjo (3)
 Caleb Beavers – gang vocals (2)
 Emily Beavers – gang vocals (2)
 Liz Beavers – gang vocals (2)
 Dierks Bentley – lead vocals (all tracks)
 Steve Brewster – drums (2,4,5,6,7,8,9,11), percussion (2,5,6)
 Jason Carter – fiddle (12)
 Jimmy Carter – bass guitar (except 10 and 12)
 Joanna Carter – gang vocals (2)
 J.T. Corenflos – electric guitar (except 10 and 12)
 Mike Dungan – gang vocals (2)
 Patty Griffin – duet vocals (7), background vocals (7)
 Jimmy Harnen – gang vocals (2)
 Rob Harrington – bass guitar (10), space bass (1)
 Lona Heins – background vocals (4,7,11)
 Steve Hodge – gang vocals (2)
 Autumn House – gang vocals (2)
 Rod Janzen – electric guitar (1,10), Danelectro guitar (10)
 Mike Johnson – pedal steel guitar (3)
 Charlie Judge – keyboards (3,4,6,9,11), percussion (6)
 Randy Kohrs – dobro (8,12)
 Rob McCoury – banjo (12)
 Ronnie McCoury – mandolin (12), background vocals (12)
 Mike McCready – electric guitar (1)
 Greg Magnum – background vocals (1), gang vocals (2)
 Steve Misamore – drums (1,3,10), percussion (1)
 Gary Morse – lap steel guitar (1,5), pedal steel guitar (2,4,6,7,9,10,11)
 Bryan Sutton – banjo (1,2,7,8,9), bouzouki (10,11), acoustic guitar (all tracks), gut string guitar (6), mandolin (9)
 Russell Terrell – background vocals (except 7 and 12)

Chart performance

Weekly charts

Year-end charts

Singles

Certifications

References

2009 albums 
Albums produced by Brett Beavers
Capitol Records Nashville albums
Dierks Bentley albums